Qırıqlı (also, Qırıxlı, Kyrykhly, and Kyrykly) is a village and municipality in the Goygol Rayon of Azerbaijan.  It has a population of 2,133.  The municipality consists of the villages of Qırıqlı, Haçaqaya, and Sərkar.

References 

Populated places in Goygol District